Senator Bliss may refer to:

Aaron T. Bliss (1837–1906), Michigan State Senate
George Bliss (Massachusetts politician) (1793–1873), Massachusetts State Senate
Larry Bliss (born 1946), Maine State Senate
Stephen Bliss (1787–1847), Virginia State Senate